gaff rig pocket cruiser built between 1985 and 2002. Approximately 122 were built before production ceased.

Designer: Eric Bergqvist

Builders: Ferry Boatyard, Cheshire, England

Length on deck: 
Length overall: 
Waterline length: 
Beam: 
Draught: 1 ft 2in / 2 ft 6in (twin retractable bilge boards)
Displacement: 650 kg
Sails:
Main      
Jib        
Topsail

See also
Gaff rig

External links
Home page and discussion forum
Archival news articles and press clippings

Sailing ships